Marlina the Murderer in Four Acts is a 2017 Indonesian thriller drama film directed by Mouly Surya based on a story conceived by Garin Nugroho and a screenplay co-written by Surya and Rama Adi. The film's Western style, its feminist tone, and rural Indonesian setting led to the term "satay Western" being coined following its world premiere in the Directors' Fortnight section of the 2017 Cannes Film Festival.

At the 38th Citra Awards, the film won 10 awards out of 15 nominations, breaking the records for most wins and nominations at Indonesia's top film awards previously held by Teguh Karya's 1986 film Ibunda with 9 awards out of 10 nominations at the 17th Citra Awards. It was also selected as the Indonesian official entry for the Best Foreign Language Film at the 91st Academy Awards, but failed to secure a nomination.

Overall, throughout the 2017 and 2018 award seasons and film festivals calendar, Marlina the Murderer in Four Acts won 29 awards out of 74 nominations.

AFI Fest

Asia-Pacific Film Festival

Asia-Pacific Screen Awards

Asian Academy Creative Awards

Asian Film Awards

Bandung Film Festival

Cannes Film Festival

Citra Awards

Gothenburg Film Festival

Indonesian Movie Awards

International Film Festival Rotterdam

Maya Awards

Sitges Film Festival

Tempo Film Festival

Tokyo FILMeX

References

External links 
 

Marlina and the Murderer in Four Acts